Bulbophyllum rugosibulbum is a species of orchid in the genus Bulbophyllum. It is one of several orchids first discovered by the Northern Rhodesian forestry officer Wilfred D. Holmes.

References

The Bulbophyllum-Checklist
The Internet Orchid Species Photo Encyclopedia
Orchid Monographs: A Taxonomic Revision of the Continental African Bulbophyllinae By J. J. Vermeulen, Orchid Monographs 2, (1987) p43

rugosibulbum